Kilometro (English: Kilometer) is a hit song by Filipino singer-actress Sarah Geronimo. It is the carrier single of her eleventh studio album Perfectly Imperfect. The song was written by Thyro Alfaro and Yumi Lacsamana and premiered on radio stations nationwide on September 17, 2014.

In July 2015, Sarah Geronimo, with her song "Kilometro", represented the Philippines in the 10th International Song Contest: The Global Sound, hosted by an Australian jury, as one of the 70 semi-finalists from different countries all over the world and later on advanced as one of the top 25 finalists. At the final round, it won the "Gold Global Sound" Award as the top recognition.

Music video

Background and release
The music video was directed by Paul Basinillo. It premiered on MTV Pinoy channel on November 26, 2014. It also premiered on the official YouTube channel of VIVA on November 27, 2014.

Cover versions

In June 2015, Filipino-American boy band The Filharmonic recorded an a cappella version of the song which was posted to their official YouTube channel. The Voice Kids contenders Lyca Gairanod and Darlene Vibares performed the song on It's Showtime on May 14, 2015. Team Sarah alumni Jason Dy performed the song on Kris TV in October 2015. Tawag ng Tanghalan Grand Finalist and 2nd placer Sam Mangubat performed the song on the competition's "Ang Huling Tapatan Day 4." Filipino band The Juans covered the song on Wish 107.5 FM Bus. In January 2016, American Children's Choir Chicago Men and DiMension Chicago Children's Choir choose the song to perform on World Music Festival 2016 in Chicago. In April 2017, Your Face Sounds Familiar Kids contestant AC Bonifacio choose Sarah Geronimo to emulate, she performed Kilometro for the show's grand finals. Aside from different song covers, there are also various dance covers of the song "Kilometro" online.

Release history

The song premiered on different radio stations across the Philippines on September 17, 2014. Upon its release, it topped the MYX Chart for several weeks.

Media usage
The melody of this song was used in a Jollibee commercial performing together with Anne Curtis.
A five-second snippet of the song was used in Todd Field's 2022 film, Tár.

Awards and recognition

Sarah Geronimo won the 10th International Singing Contest: The Global Sound for her song "Kilometro." Geronimo beat out 25 other countries and their corresponding singers to win the Gold Global Sound award.

References 

Sarah Geronimo songs
2014 singles
2014 songs
Tagalog-language songs